Kenneth Lau Ip-keung  (born 1966) is a New Territories rural leader in Hong Kong. He is the current chairman of the Heung Yee Kuk and member of the Legislative Council of Hong Kong for the Heung Yee Kuk functional constituency, succeeding his father Lau Wong-fat in 2015 and 2016 respectively. He has been an unofficial member of the Executive Council of Hong Kong since 2017. He was awarded the Bronze Bauhinia Star by the Hong Kong SAR Government in 2017.

Biography
Lau was born in 1966 to Lau Wong-fat, the powerful rural leader and the chairman of the Heung Yee Kuk for 35 years. He graduated from the London School of Economics in 1989 with a degree in mathematics and statistics. In May 2015, he was elected unchallenged to the Kuk chairmanship upon his father's retirement.

Lau was an appointed member of Tuen Mun District Council from 2000 to 2011. He was also a member of the government's Environmental Campaign Committee (2010–13).

Since 2006, he has been a member of the Election Committee, under the New Territories District Council Subsector from 2006 to 2011 and through Heung Yee Kuk since 2011.

Lau is a director of the Community Chest of Hong Kong. He and his wife, Judy Lau Yap Ai-ai, are members of the Hong Kong Jockey Club and horse owners.

Lau was revealed to be a British citizen by documents in the Panama Papers.

In the 2016 Hong Kong Legislative Council election, he succeeded his father to become a member of the Legislative Council in the Heung Yee Kuk functional constituency unopposed.

Property 
According to his July 2020 declaration of interest, he owns more than 400 pieces of land throughout Hong Kong. In addition to the Hong Kong Jockey Club, the declaration lists him as a member of other organisations such as the Mission Hills Golf Club, Gold Coast Yacht and Country Club, and the Hong Kong Golf Club.

In 2021, police in Lung Kwu Tan seized 10 speedboats and a record 57 engines, both used for illegal smuggling, in a 100,000 sqft warehouse belonging to a company owned by Lau and his family.

According to Lau's January 2022 declaration of assets, he owns properties and land in Hong Kong, as well as land in Wuhan and Huizhou. He also declared shares in 105 companies, ranging from moneylending businesses to catering businesses.

In August 2022, his latest declaration of assets specified that he owns 456 plots of land in New Territories and 7 residential units in Tuen Mun for "self-use". He owns an additional 8 residential units in Hong Kong, for a total of 15 residential units, along with 5 commercial properties.

Housing

Small House Policy 
Lau is a supporter of the Small House Policy, and in January 2021, after the judiciary reinstated building rights for the Small House Policy, claimed "I heard some describe this as a 'big win' for us ... but the judgment is actually good for the whole of Hong Kong." Critics of the Small House Policy have said that the policy is "wasteful of land" that could instead be used for high rise developments. In February 2021, Lau said that the government hadn't fixed the housing supply issue in Hong Kong, and that "They can talk the talk, but they haven’t walked the talk," despite Lau's fighting for the Small House Policy, which takes up around 5,000 hectares of land in Hong Kong.

Lau has also said that overseas male descendants of indigenous villagers should be entitled to the small house policy even if they are not Hong Kong residents, and that "Despite them being overseas, we should not strip them of their rights."

Land reclamation 
In October 2021, Lau said that villagers in Lung Kwu Tan in Tuen Mun would object to the government's land reclamation project near their homes, meant to create more land for the housing shortfall in Hong Kong.

Personal life 
Lau is a member of the Hong Kong Jockey Club and in August 2022, was in a election to get seats on the board of stewards. According to an editorial by The Standard, Lau broke a tradition by participating in the election despite not being invited to do so. The editorial also mentioned that Lau winning or losing the election would reflect on if he had the "blessing of the government" and if the political clout of the Heung Yee Kuk was good enough. In September 2022, Lau placed dead last in the election, the only loser in a contest that saw 8 people on the ballot for 7 seats.

References

1966 births
Living people
Hong Kong people of Hakka descent
People from Huiyang
District councillors of Tuen Mun District
Indigenous inhabitants of the New Territories in Hong Kong
Members of the Election Committee of Hong Kong, 2007–2012
Members of the Election Committee of Hong Kong, 2012–2017
Hong Kong racehorse owners and breeders
Business and Professionals Alliance for Hong Kong politicians
Members of the Executive Council of Hong Kong
HK LegCo Members 2016–2021
HK LegCo Members 2022–2025
Recipients of the Bronze Bauhinia Star
Members of the 14th Chinese People's Political Consultative Conference